The Hobey Baker Legends of College Hockey Award is an annual award presented by the Hobey Baker Memorial Award Committee to honor "one of the all-time great contributors to the game of college hockey."

In 1981, the Hobey Baker Memorial Award Committee established two annual awards. While the Hobey Baker Award is given to the individual selected as the outstanding NCAA men's ice hockey player of the current year, the "Legends of College Hockey Award"  honors a player, coach, or administrator who has made outstanding historic contributions to the sport.

Award winners

References

College men's ice hockey in the United States
College ice hockey coach of the year awards in the United States
+
Awards established in 1981
1981 establishments in the United States